Maurice H. Harbin (born April 2, 1955) is an American politician who has served in the Georgia State Senate from the 16th district since 2015.

References

1955 births
Living people
Republican Party Georgia (U.S. state) state senators
21st-century American politicians